Colonia Soto may refer to the following places in Mexico:

Colonia Soto, Chihuahua
Colonia Soto, Sonora